This article attempts to list the oldest extant buildings surviving in the state of New Jersey in the United States of America, including the oldest houses in New Jersey and any other surviving structures. Some dates are approximate and based upon dendochronology, architectural studies, and historical records. Sites on the list are generally from the First Period of American architecture or earlier.
To be listed here a site must:
date from prior to 1776; or
be the oldest building in a county, large city, or oldest of its type (church, government building, etc.),

Colonial era

Post 1776

See also
List of the oldest buildings in the United States
National Register of Historic Places listings in New Jersey
List of Washington's Headquarters during the Revolutionary War
New Jersey Historic Trust
Monmouth County Historical Association
Meadows Foundation (New Jersey)
New Bridge Landing
Cranford Historical Preservation Advisory Board
Raritan Landing

References

External links
 NJ Arts and Architecture: Chronological listing of historic buildings in NJ

New Jersey
Architecture in New Jersey
Oldest